Sonoya Mizuno (born 1 July 1986) is a Japanese actress, model, and ballet dancer.

Mizuno starred in the miniseries Maniac and the Game of Thrones prequel series House of the Dragon, and appeared in all the works directed by Alex Garland, such as the films Ex Machina, Annihilation, and Men, and his miniseries Devs. Other roles include minor appearances in La La Land, Beauty and the Beast, and Crazy Rich Asians.

Early life
Born in Tokyo, Mizuno was raised in Somerset, England. Her mother is of half English and half Argentine descent and her father is Japanese. She graduated from the Royal Ballet School before dancing with several ballet companies, including Semperoper Ballet in Dresden, Ballet Ireland, New English Ballet Theatre and Scottish Ballet.

Career
Mizuno took up professional modelling at age 20 with Profile Models in London and has modelled for Chanel, Alexander McQueen, Saint Laurent and Louis Vuitton. During 2014, she appeared in Arthur Pita's work of dance theatre The World's Greatest Show at Greenwich Dance and the Royal Opera House.

She made her film debut in Alex Garland's science-fiction thriller Ex Machina in 2014. Mizuno appeared in the dance film High Strung, directed by Michael Damian and released in 2016. Also in 2016, she was the feature dancer in the music video for "Wide Open" by The Chemical Brothers and Beck, and appeared in the music video for Frank Ocean's song "Nikes". Later in 2016, she was in La La Land, playing the role of Caitlin, one of the three roommates of Mia, played by Emma Stone.

In 2017, Mizuno appeared in a small role as the debutante in Disney's live-action adaptation of Beauty and the Beast, and in 2018, she acted in the Warner Bros. film Crazy Rich Asians.

She has appeared in television/ streaming roles including Cary Joji Fukunaga's Maniac on Netflix. In 2018, she took the lead role of Lily Chan in Alex Garland's miniseries for FX, Devs.

Mizuno starred in the 2016 Dom & Nic video for The Chemical Brothers' "Wide Open", featuring Beck, where she played a dancer gradually transformed into a 3-D lattice.

Filmography

Film

Television

References

External links

Living people
1986 births
21st-century British actresses
21st-century Japanese actresses
Actresses from Somerset
Actresses from Tokyo
British actresses of Japanese descent
British actors of Latin American descent
British ballerinas
British film actresses
British people of Argentine descent
British television actresses
Citizens of the United Kingdom through descent
Japanese ballerinas
Japanese emigrants to the United Kingdom
Japanese expatriates in England
Japanese film actresses
Japanese people of Argentine descent
Japanese people of British descent
People educated at the Royal Ballet School